A.L. Gebhardt & Co. was a leather tanning company founded in 1895. It operated in Milwaukee, Wisconsin and Berlin, Germany It produced leather for shoes, handbags and belts. It was owned by U.S. Leather in the late 1980s. Operations were ceased by U.S. Leather in 2000.

References

1895 establishments in Wisconsin
2000 disestablishments in Wisconsin
Defunct leather manufacturers
Manufacturing companies based in Milwaukee
Manufacturing companies disestablished in 2000
Manufacturing companies established in 1895
Defunct companies based in Wisconsin
Manufacturing companies based in Wisconsin